Ted Hughes (1930-1998) was an English poet.

Ted Hughes may also refer to:

Ted Hughes (footballer) (1876-?), Welsh footballer
Ted Hughes (judge) (?-2020), Canadian judge

See also
Teddy Hughes (disambiguation)
Edward Hughes (disambiguation)